Taiyuan East railway station is a railway station on the Tongpu Railway, Shitai Railway and Shitai Passenger Railway, in the People's Republic of China.

In 1959, the station changed to its current name from Taiyuan North railway station.

References 

Railway stations in Shanxi
Stations on the Qingdao–Taiyuan High-Speed Railway
Railway stations in China opened in 1933